Kate Fanny Loder, later Lady Thompson, (21 August 1825 – 30 August 1904) was an English composer and pianist.

Biography
Kate Loder was born on 21 August 1825, on Bathwick Street, Bathwick, within Bath, Somerset where the Loder family were prominent musicians. Her father was the flautist George Loder. According to Grove, her mother was a piano teacher born Fanny Philpot, who was the sister of the pianist Lucy Anderson. However, genealogical research suggests Kate's mother was Frances Elizabeth Mary Kirkham (1802–50), daughter of Thomas Bulman Kirkham (1778–1845) and Marianne Beville Moore (c.1781 – 1810). Frances Kirkham's step-mother was Jane Harriett Philpot (1802–63), second wife to Thomas Bulman Kirkham and sister of the Lucy Philpot who married the violinist George Frederick Anderson, becoming Lucy Anderson. Kate was also the sister of conductor and composer George Loder, and the cousin of composer Edward Loder.
   
Kater Loder studied at the Royal Academy of Music in London.  Her performance of Mendelssohn's G minor piano concerto at the Hanover-square Rooms on 27 May 1843, when she was aged 17, may have been her public debut. The following year, in 1844, aged just 18, she became the first female professor of harmony at the Royal Academy. On 16 December 1851 at St Marylebone Church, Westminster, she married Sir Henry Thompson and soon afterwards, at her husband's insistence, gave up her public performing career. She remained active in music, continuing to compose, and taught pupils including Sarah Louisa Kilpack who nowadays is better known as an artist.

On 10 July 1871, the first British performance of the German Requiem of Johannes Brahms took place privately at Loder's home, 35 Wimpole Street, London. It was performed using a version for piano duet accompaniment which became known as the "London Version" of the Requiem. Brahms based it on an 1866 arrangement for piano of his first, six-movement version of the Requiem. The pianists were Kate Loder and Cipriani Potter (who was then 79 years old; he died that September).

She died on 30 August 1904 at Headley Rectory, Headley, Surrey.

Works
Selected works include:

Chamber
String quartet in G minor (1846)
Sonata for violin and piano (1847)
String quartet in E minor (1847)
Piano trio (1886)

Opera
L'elisir d'amore (1855)

Orchestral
Overture (1844)

Organ
Six Easy Voluntaries. Set 1. (London: Novello, 1889)
Six Easy Voluntaries. Set 2. (London: Novello, 1891)
for the most part fresh and genial in character […] somewhat suggestive of Spohr in the numerous chromatic progressions.

Piano
Twelve studies (1852)
Three romances (1853)
Pensée fugitive (1854)
En Avant galop (1863)
Three Duets (1869)
Mazurka (1899)
Scherzo (1899)

Songs
My faint spirit (1854), text by Shelley

External links

References

Sources

Notes

1825 births
1904 deaths
19th-century classical composers
20th-century classical composers
Women classical composers
English opera composers
English classical composers
English classical pianists
English women pianists
People from Bath, Somerset
Musicians from Somerset
Academics of the Royal Academy of Music
Alumni of the Royal Academy of Music
20th-century English composers
19th-century classical pianists
19th-century English musicians
Women opera composers
20th-century English women musicians
19th-century British composers
Women music educators
Women classical pianists
20th-century women composers
19th-century women composers
Composers for pipe organ
19th-century English women
19th-century women pianists
20th-century women pianists